Hau Man-kin (born 2 May 1992) is a Hong Kong social activist and former member of the Yuen Long District Council for Tin Shing. He is formerly a covenor of the Tin Shui Wai Connection.

Biography
Raised in Yuen Long, Kwan formed Tin Shui Wai Connection with other Tin Shui Wai netizens in 2019 aiming at contesting in the 2019 District Council election against the pro-Beijing incumbents. Kwan ran against pro-Beijing incumbent Lau Kwai-yung in Tin Shing and received 3,347 votes, winning the seat by a narrow margin of 517 votes.

References

1992 births
Living people
District councillors of Yuen Long District
Hong Kong democracy activists
Hong Kong localists
Tin Shui Wai Connection politicians